Roger Jensen (September 5, 1933 - April 26, 2001) was an American photographer and the first known person to actively photograph storms beginning in 1953.

See also 
 David K. Hoadley
 Neil Ward

References

External links 
 Roger Jensen's Photography {Storm Track)

20th-century American photographers
People from Fargo, North Dakota
1933 births
2001 deaths